Joachim "Joko" Winterscheidt (born 13 January 1979) is a German television host, producer and actor. He became known as part of the duo Joko & Klaas alongside Klaas Heufer-Umlauf in TV programs like Circus HalliGalli.

Winterscheidt grew up in Waldniel. Since 2005, he is a presenter at MTV Germany. Since 2010, he is an employee of TV productions company Endemol, along with Heufer-Umlauf. Having previously lived in Berlin, he and his family moved to Munich in 2015.

Works

Filmography

Television

 23. Juli 2007: Schmeckt nicht, gibt's nicht along with Tim Mälzer
 Total Request Live
 2006–2008: HotSports (MTV)
 Jokos Roadtrip (MTV)
 2008–2010: The Dome
 2009–2011: MTV Home along with Klaas Heufer-Umlauf
 2010–2012: Ahnungslos along with Klaas Heufer-Umlauf
 2011: Echo 2011 moderation with Ina Müller
 2011: TVLab (ZDFneo)
 2011–2012: 17 Meter along with Klaas Heufer-Umlauf
 2011–2013: neoParadise along with Klaas Heufer-Umlauf
 2011: Joko & Klaas – Die Rechnung geht auf uns along with Klaas Heufer-Umlauf
 2011–2012: 1 Live Beeck und Winterscheidt – Die tägliche Nachmittagsschau auf 1Live
 Silvester 2011/2012: Willkommen 2012 – Silvester live vom Brandenburger Tor along with Mirjam Weichselbraun and Klaas Heufer-Umlauf
 since 2012: Joko gegen Klaas – Das Duell um die Welt along with Klaas Heufer-Umlauf (ProSieben)
 Silvester 2012/2013: Willkommen 2013 – Silvester live vom Brandenburger Tor along with Mirjam Weichselbraun and Klaas Heufer-Umlauf
 2013–2017: Circus HalliGalli along with Klaas Heufer-Umlauf (ProSieben)
 since 2014: Mein bester Feind along with Klaas Heufer-Umlauf (ProSieben)
 2015: 20 Jahre Akte: Das große Spezial mit Joko und Klaas along with Klaas Heufer-Umlauf and Ulrich Meyer (Sat.1)
 since 2015: Teamwork – Spiel mit deinem Star 
 2016: Die beste Show der Welt (ProSieben) along with Klaas Heufer-Umlauf
 2017: Beginner gegen Gewinner ("Beginner vs. Winner") (ProSieben)
 2018: Win Your Song (ProSieben)
 since 2018: Das Ding des Jahres (ProSieben)
 since 2018: Weihnachten mit Joko und Klaas (ProSieben) with Klaas Heufer-Umlauf
 since 2019: Joko & Klaas gegen ProSieben (ProSieben) with Klaas Heufer-Umlauf
 2019: Taff (ProSieben) mit Klaas Heufer-Umlauf
 2019: Das Traumschiff – Antigua

Films
 2013: Battle of the Year
 2015: Der Nanny
 2015: Look Who's Back (cameo)
 2017: Sharknado 5: Global Swarming

Voice actor
 2012: Tim and Eric's Billion Dollar Movie
 2012: Die Piraten! – Ein Haufen merkwürdiger Typen (stop motion film)
 2017: Despicable Me 3 (Balthazar Bratt, German voice-over)

Discography

Singles 
 2014: U-Bahn-Ficker (along with Eko Fresh and Klaas Heufer-Umlauf)

Awards 
1 Live Krone
 2014: Sonderpreis (with Klaas Heufer-Umlauf)

Brillenträger des Jahres
 2015

Deutscher Comedypreis
 2013: Beste Comedyshow für Circus HalliGalli (with Klaas Heufer-Umlauf)

Deutscher Fernsehpreis
 2012: Besondere Leistung Unterhaltung (with Klaas Heufer-Umlauf)
 2014: Bester Show-Moderator (Publikumspreis, with Klaas Heufer-Umlauf)
 2016: Beste Unterhaltung Primetime for Joko gegen Klaas – Das Duell um die Welt (with Klaas Heufer-Umlauf)
 2017: Beste Unterhaltung Primetime for Die beste Show der Welt (with Klaas Heufer-Umlauf)

ECHO
 2014: Partner des Jahres for Circus HalliGalli (with Klaas Heufer-Umlauf)

Goldene Henne
 2019: Entertainment for Alle Wege führen nach Ruhm (with Paul Ripke)

Grimme-Preis
 2014: Unterhaltung for Circus HalliGalli (with Klaas Heufer-Umlauf)
 2018: Unterhaltung for #Gosling-Gate (with Circus HalliGalli)
 2020: Unterhaltung für Joko & Klaas LIVE – 15 Minuten (Staffel 1, with Thomas Martiens, Thomas Schmitt and Klaas Heufer-Umlauf)

Radio Regenbogen Award
 2017: Medienmänner 2016 (with Klaas Heufer-Umlauf)

Rose d’Or
 2014: Entertainment für Circus HalliGalli (with Klaas Heufer-Umlauf)

References

External links

Joko Winterscheidt at www.prosieben.de

German male comedians
German television personalities
German game show hosts
1979 births
Living people
People from Mönchengladbach
ProSieben people